Da Buzz is a Swedish Eurodance/pop music group. Members of the group are writers/producers Per Lidén and Pier Schmid and lead-singer Annika Thörnquist. All three are from Karlstad.

The band has had a successful career in their native Sweden, with a career spanning seven years, five albums, and 15 hit singles.  They have reached #1 twice in their homeland; in 2003 with "Alive" and in 2006 with "Last Goodbye". The band landed a #1 Billboard Magazine Club hit in the United States with the Hex Hector remix of "Let Me Love You". They participated in Melodifestivalen in 2003 with the song "Stop Look Listen". A greatest hits album was released in November 2007.  Their latest single "Baby Listen to Me" was released in September 2007, and became the band's 9th top 10 hit.

On 10 July 2009, Da Buzz announced: "[...]is currently taking a break and we would like to thank all our fans for your wonderful support during the years. We will be back in the future but we don't know when yet. Thank you" Da Buzz "came back" in 2010 with brand new single "U Gotta Dance" on 7 June.

In June 2011, one of the Karlstad transit buses was named after the group.

Albums

Singles 

 * Download only singles.  "Wanna Love You Forever" and "Come Away With Me" were ineligible for the Swedish charts as at the time downloads were not included in the Swedish singles chart.  "Soon My Heart" charted on download only sales, which were incorporated into the Swedish charts in January 2007.

Japan bonus tracks
Wanna Be With Me?: One of Us, Wonder Where You Are (Da Rob'n'Raz Remix Radio Gizzm)
Da Sound: WO Ai Ni, Fascination, One in a Million, Let Me Love You (Hex), Let Me Love You (Axwell), Let Me Love You (Club)
Last Goodbye: Dreams

References

External links 
 
 Da Buzz Russian site

Musical groups established in 1999
Musical groups disestablished in 2009
Swedish electronic music groups
Swedish house music groups
Swedish Eurodance groups
Eurodance groups
English-language singers from Sweden
Musical groups reestablished in 2010
1999 establishments in Sweden
Karlstad
Melodifestivalen contestants of 2003